James Moody's Moods is an album by saxophonist James Moody composed of sessions recorded in 1954 and 1955, released on the Prestige label.

Track listing
 "The Strut" (Benny Golson) – 4:02
 "Jammin' with James"  (Dave Burns, James Moody) – 11:36
 "A Sinner Kissed an Angel" (Mack David, Larry Shayne) – 4:02
 "It Might as Well Be Spring" - (alto sax take) (Oscar Hammerstein II, Richard Rodgers) – 3:46
 "I've Got the Blues" (Eddie Jefferson) – 2:45
 "Blue Walk" (Benny Golson) – 3:13
 "Faster James" (Quincy Jones) – 3:40
Recorded at Van Gelder Studio in Hackensack, New Jersey on September 29, 1954 (track 4), January 28, 1955 (tracks 5-7), August 24, 1955 (track 2) and December 12, 1955 (tracks 1 & 3)

Personnel
James Moody – tenor saxophone, alto saxophone
Dave Burns – trumpet
William Shepherd – trombone
Pee Wee Moore – baritone saxophone
Jimmy Boyd – piano
John Latham – bass
Clarence Johnston – drums
Eddie Jefferson – vocal (track 5)
Bob Weinstock – supervisor
Rudy Van Gelder – engineer

References

James Moody (saxophonist) albums
1956 albums
Prestige Records albums
Albums produced by Bob Weinstock
Albums recorded at Van Gelder Studio